Gabriele Venditti (born 25 April 1997) is a Polish-born Italian professional rugby union player who primarily plays lock for Zebre Parma of the United Rugby Championship.

Professional career 
Venditti previously played for clubs such as Lazio and Calvisano. Under contract with Calvisano, in 2020–21 Pro14 season, he was named as Additional Player for Zebre.

In 2016 and 2017, Venditti was named in the Italy Under 20 squad.

References

External links 

1997 births
Living people
Italian rugby union players
Rugby union locks
Rugby Calvisano players
People from Pyskowice
S.S. Lazio Rugby 1927 players
Zebre Parma players